Senjedak is a village in Hamzehlu Rural District, in the Central District of Khomeyn County, Markazi Province, Iran. At the 2006 census, its population was 108, in 33 families.

References 

Populated places in Khomeyn County